This is a list of tornadoes which have been officially or unofficially labeled as F4, EF4, IF4, or an equivalent rating during the 2020s decade. These scales – the Fujita scale, the Enhanced Fujita scale, the International Fujita scale, and the TORRO tornado intensity scale – attempt to estimate the intensity of a tornado by classifying the damage caused to natural features and man-made structures in the tornado's path.

Tornadoes are among the most violent known meteorological phenomena. Each year, more than 2,000 tornadoes are recorded worldwide, with the vast majority occurring in North America and Europe. To assess the intensity of these events, meteorologist Ted Fujita devised a method to estimate maximum wind speeds within tornadic storms based on the damage caused; this became known as the Fujita scale. The scale ranks tornadoes from F0 to F5, with F0 being the least intense and F5 being the most intense.

Following two particularly devastating tornadoes in 1997 and 1999, engineers questioned the reliability of the Fujita scale. Ultimately, a new scale was devised that took into account 28 different damage indicators; this became known as the Enhanced Fujita scale. The Enhanced Fujita scale is used predominantly in North America. Most of Europe, on the other hand, uses the TORRO tornado intensity scale (or T-Scale), which ranks tornado intensity between T0 and T11; F4/EF4 tornadoes are approximately equivalent to T8 to T9 on the T-Scale. Tornadoes rated IF4 on the International Fujita scale are also included on this list. Violent tornadoes, those rated F4/EF4 and F5/EF5 are rare and only make up 2% of all recorded tornadoes.

List 
Worldwide during the 2020s, 14 tornadoes have been rated F4/EF4/IF4. Thirteen of these tornadoes occurred in the United States, receiving EF4 ratings, and one F4/IF4 occurred in the Czech Republic. These tornadoes have caused 116 fatalities and over 1008 injuries. The two most recent EF4 tornadoes both occurred on November 4, 2022 – the first impacted areas near Caviness and Powderly, Texas, while the second went through areas near Clarksville, Texas and Idabel, Oklahoma.

See also 
 Tornado intensity and damage
 List of tornadoes and tornado outbreaks
 List of F5 and EF5 tornadoes
 List of F4 and EF4 tornadoes

 List of F4 and EF4 tornadoes (2010–2019)
 List of tornadoes striking downtown areas
 Tornado myths

Notes

References 

 
Tornado-related lists
2020s natural disasters